Frederick Humphrey Semple (December 24, 1872 – December 20, 1927) was an American golfer and tennis player who competed in the 1904 Summer Olympics.

In 1904 he was part of the American team which won the silver medal in the team golf event. He finished 14th in this competition. In the individual competition he finished 26th in the qualification and was eliminated in the first round of the match play.

He also competed in the tennis doubles tournament with his partner George Stadel, but they were eliminated in the first round.

References

External links
 
 

American male golfers
Amateur golfers
American male tennis players
Golfers at the 1904 Summer Olympics
Medalists at the 1904 Summer Olympics
Olympic silver medalists for the United States in golf
Olympic tennis players of the United States
Tennis players at the 1904 Summer Olympics
1872 births
1927 deaths